The Asian giant softshell turtle (Pelochelys cantorii), also known commonly as Cantor's giant softshell turtle and the frog-faced softshell turtle, is a species of freshwater turtle in the family Trionychidae. The species is native to Southeast Asia. The species is critically endangered and in the 20th century has disappeared from much of its former range.

Taxonomy
P. cantorii is not found in New Guinea, while the two other members of the genus Pelochelys, P. bibroni and P. signifera are both restricted to New Guinea. P. cantorii is relatively unstudied, and the current species may actually be composed of several taxa. One study from 1995 showed that what was once thought to be P. cantorii in New Guinea was actually P. bibroni, and the earlier studies of P. cantorii only described populations farther to the west.

Description
The Asian giant softshell turtle has a broad head, and small eyes close to the tip of its snout. The carapace is smooth and olive-colored. Juveniles may have dark-spotted carapaces and heads, with yellow around the carapace.

Behavior and reproduction
P. cantorii is an ambush predator and primarily carnivorous, feeding on crustaceans, mollusks and fish (although some aquatic plants may also be eaten). The turtle spends 95% of its life buried and motionless, with only its eyes and mouth protruding from the sand.

Morphological variation

Morphological differences in neural bone count have been noted between specimens of P. cantorii found in the Philippines and specimens found in mainland Asia.

Etymology
The specific name, cantorii, is in honor of Danish zoologist Theodore Edward Cantor.

Geographic range and habitat
The species P. cantorii is primarily found in inland, slow-moving, freshwater rivers and streams. Some evidence indicates that its range extends to coastal areas, as well. It occurs in eastern and southern India, Bangladesh, Burma, Thailand, Malaysia, Laos, Cambodia, Vietnam, eastern and southern China, the Philippines (Luzon and Mindanao), and Indonesia (Kalimantan, Java, and Sumatra).

Conservation
The Asian giant softshell turtle is classified as a Critically Endangered by the IUCN and has been forced out through habitat destruction, disappearing from much of its range. Prior to 2007, it was last seen in Cambodia in 2003. A 2007 survey of one area of the Mekong River in Cambodia found the turtle in abundance along a  stretch of the river.

In the Philippines, a juvenile Cantor's turtle known as “cagot" appeared and was captured by a fisherman along the Addalam River, Cabarroguis, Quirino, Isabela. In 2001, this turtle was sent to Chicago and its identity confirmed. The reptile has been evaluated as an EDGE species by the Zoological Society of London.

References

Further reading
Das, Indraneil (2002). A Photographic Guide to Snakes and other Reptiles of India. Sanibel Island, Florida: Ralph Curtis Books. 144 pp. . (Pelochelys cantorii, p. 139).

External links

"Pelochelys cantorii ". The Reptile Database. No date. Accessed May 18, 2007.
"Pelochelys Gallery". Turtle and Tortoise Information. World Chelonian Trust. No date. Accessed May 18, 2007.
Soft Shell turtle discovered in Sabang Pulau Weh Sumatra Indonesia.

Pelochelys
Reptiles of China
Reptiles of India
Reptiles of Myanmar
Reptiles of Vietnam
Reptiles of Cambodia
Reptiles of Laos
Reptiles of Thailand
Reptiles of Brunei
Reptiles of Indonesia
Reptiles of Malaysia
Reptiles of the Philippines
Reptiles of Papua New Guinea
Reptiles described in 1864
Taxa named by John Edward Gray
Turtles of New Guinea
Reptiles of Borneo
Critically endangered fauna of China